That's the Way It Goes may refer to:
 "That's the Way It Goes" (George Harrison song), 1982
 "That's the Way It Goes" (Anne Murray song), 1997